The M3 is an expressway in Cape Town, South Africa, connecting the upper part of the City Bowl to the Southern Suburbs and ending in Tokai. For most of its route it parallels - though further to the south and west - the M4 (Main Road), which was the original road connecting central Cape Town with the settlements to the south.

Route
The M3 begins at a traffic light on Buitengracht Street (the M62) and runs south-east as Buitensingel Street, a dual-carriage roadway. For the next three kilometres it runs south and then east through Gardens; it changes names regularly, being named Orange Street, Annandale Road, Mill Street and Jutland Avenue. At Roeland Street, which is numbered as Exit 1, the M3 becomes a grade separated dual carriageway and takes on the name Philip Kgosana Drive, named after an activist who led a peaceful march along the road in 1960. Prior to 2017, this section was named De Waal Drive, after Sir Frederic de Waal, the first Administrator of the Cape Province, who commissioned the road.

This section of the M3 runs eastwards across the north face of Devil's Peak to Hospital Bend, located immediately next to Groote Schuur Hospital, where it intersects with the N2 Nelson Mandela Boulevard section (formerly Eastern Boulevard).

Around Hospital Bend, the M3 is concurrent with the N2 for approximately a kilometre as a highway with 5 lanes in each direction; when the N2 branches off to the east as Settlers Way, the M3 runs south as Rhodes Drive past the University of Cape Town. This section of the highway forms the western boundary of the suburbs of Mowbray, Rosebank, Rondebosch, and part of Newlands. It separates these suburbs from the Table Mountain National Park, except where the Upper Campus of the University is located west of the freeway.

In Newlands, the M3 turns away from Table Mountain and the grade separation ends; there are 5 traffic lights along this section. In this area it is named variously Union Avenue, Paradise Road and Edinburgh Drive. As it passes over Wynberg Hill, the M3 attains freeway status again. This section is known officially as the Simon van der Stel Freeway and colloquially as the Blue Route. It proceeds southward through Constantia and Tokai, terminating at exit 23, an intersection with Steenberg Road (the M42). Steenberg Road connects the terminus of the M3 with Main Road (the M4) in the east, which continues southwards along the False Bay coast to Muizenberg, Fish Hoek, and Simon's Town; and with Ou Kaapse Weg (the M64) in the west, which crosses the Silvermine mountains to Noordhoek.

Original plans were for the M3 to continue southwards as a freeway, as can be seen by the unfinished strips of tar under the bridge.

The M3 passes through the following suburbs:
Cape Town CBD
Gardens
Vredehoek
Zonnebloem
Woodstock
Observatory
Mowbray
Rosebank
Rondebosch
Newlands
Claremont
Bishopscourt
Wynberg
Constantia
Meadowridge
Bergvliet
Tokai
Kirstenhof

References

Roads in Cape Town
Highways in South Africa
Streets and roads of Cape Town
Metropolitan routes in Cape Town